Zhang Hongbo (Chinese: 张洪波; born 15 August 1972) is a Chinese short track speed skater. He competed in the men's 5000 metre relay event at the 1994 Winter Olympics. He won the bronze medal in the 1996 Asian Winter Games.

References

1972 births
Living people
Chinese male short track speed skaters
Olympic short track speed skaters of China
Short track speed skaters at the 1994 Winter Olympics
Place of birth missing (living people)
Short track speed skaters at the 1996 Asian Winter Games
Asian Games medalists in short track speed skating
Asian Games bronze medalists for China
Medalists at the 1996 Asian Winter Games
20th-century Chinese people